Allen Haley (January 31, 1844 – April 23, 1900) was a Canadian dentist, ship builder and political figure in Nova Scotia. He represented Hants County in the Nova Scotia House of Assembly from 1882 to 1890 and Hants in the House of Commons of Canada from 1896 to 1900 as a Liberal member.

He was born in Yarmouth, Nova Scotia, the son of Allen Haley and Harriet Utley, and was educated there. Haley went on to study at the Philadelphia College of Dental Surgery. He set up his dental practice in Windsor, Nova Scotia. In 1869, he married Annie M. Smith. He was secretary for the Shipowners Marine Insurance Company. Haley served as probate registrar for Hants County, a member of the Windsor town council and Warden for Windsor. He ran unsuccessfully for a federal seat in 1891. Haley died in office in Ottawa at the age of 56.

References 

1844 births
1900 deaths
Nova Scotia Liberal Party MLAs
Members of the House of Commons of Canada from Nova Scotia
Liberal Party of Canada MPs
People from Yarmouth, Nova Scotia